36th National Board of Review Awards
December 22, 1964
The 36th National Board of Review Awards were announced on December 22, 1964.

Top Ten Films 
Becket
My Fair Lady
Girl with Green Eyes
The World of Henry Orient
Zorba the Greek
Topkapi
The Chalk Garden
The Finest Hours
Four Days in November
Séance on a Wet Afternoon

Top Foreign Films 
World Without Sun
The Organizer
Anatomy of a Marriage
Seduced and Abandoned
Yesterday, Today and Tomorrow

Winners 
 Best Film: Becket
 Best Foreign Film: World Without Sun
 Best Actor: Anthony Quinn (Zorba the Greek)
 Best Actress: Kim Stanley (Séance on a Wet Afternoon)
 Best Supporting Actor: Martin Balsam (The Carpetbaggers)
 Best Supporting Actress: Edith Evans (The Chalk Garden)
 Best Director: Desmond Davis (Girl with Green Eyes)

External links 
 National Board of Review of Motion Pictures :: Awards for 1964

1964
National Board of Review Awards
National Board of Review Awards
National Board of Review Awards
National Board of Review Awards